Heaven & Earth (Live and in the Studio 1997–2008) is the eighth of the major box set releases from English progressive rock group King Crimson, released in 2019 by Discipline Global Mobile, Panegyric Records, Inner Knot & Wowow Entertainment, Inc..

This compilation covers the period which saw the recording of The Construkction of Light, released in 2000 and the album that appears to be their studio swan-song The Power to Believe, from 2003; this boxed set documents yet another change of artistic direction.

Heaven & Earth features  re-mixed and master examples of the above two albums with previously unheard studio recordings and much more live material from the same period.

Across 18 CDs, 4 blu-ray discs (1 video and 3 audio content) and 2 DVDs (all audio content), with booklet containing sleeve-notes by Sid Smith, Robert Fripp and David Singleton. It also includes memorabilia.

Reception

John Kelman of allaboutjazz was again complementary regarding this particular set and commented that "A perfect summary to Heaven & Earth, the King Crimson box set that squeezes the most material onto any of the group's mega-box set, covers the longest time period and documents Crimson's most extensive period of experimentation, exploration and evolution through its inclusion of (almost) all ProjeKct recordings through Crimson's brief 2008 return, alongside the best-sounding versions of The (Re)ConstruKction of Light and The Power to Believe."

Speed issues 
Certain items on discs 19 and 21 run at an incorrect, faster speed on Heaven & Earth than when originally recorded and released, resulting in a higher pitch and shorter track times. These items include the Heaven And Earth album by ProjeKct X on disc 19, the 4 December 1997 concert by ProjeKct One on disc 21, and all of the contents under "The ProjeKcts On CD" on disc 21. Discipline Global Mobile have confirmed that corrected files will be available in the near future to box owners via the DGMLive website.

Track listing

References

External links 
 
 

King Crimson albums
2019 compilation albums
Discipline Global Mobile albums